The City and Guilds of London Institute is an educational organisation in the United Kingdom. Founded on 11 November 1878 by the City of London and 16 livery companies – to develop a national system of technical education, the institute has been operating under royal charter (RC117), granted by Queen Victoria, since 1900. The Prince of Wales, later King Edward VII, was appointed the first president of the institute.

The City and Guilds of London Institute is also a registered charity (no. 312832) and is the awarding body for City & Guilds and ILM qualifications, offering many accredited qualifications mapped onto the Regulated Qualifications Framework (RQF). The institute's president is the Princess Royal who accepted this role in June 2011 (following her father the Duke of Edinburgh, who held the position for nearly 60 years), and the Chairman of Council is Sir John Armitt, who took office in November 2012. The City & Guilds Group is the market facing brand for the organisation today and is composed of a number of businesses including City & Guilds, ILM, Kineo, The Oxford Group, Digitalme, and Gen2.

History
A meeting of 16 of the City of London's livery companies in 1876 led to the foundation of the City and Guilds of London Institute for the Advancement of Technical Education (CGLI), which aimed to improve the training of craftsmen, engineering technicians, engineering technologists, and professional engineers. The two main objectives were to create a Central Institution in London and to conduct a system of qualifying examinations in technical subjects.

Unable at once to find a large enough site within the City of London for their Central Institution, the CGLI occupied a building on land alongside Exhibition Road in South Kensington, although its headquarters were in Gresham College in the City. At the time John Watney was both secretary to the Gresham Committee and the CGLI. Evening classes were offered at a school in Cowper Street, off City Road, enabling instruction in chemistry and physics to be provided to those who wished to continue their education after working during the day. The school proved such a success that new premises had to be found in nearby Leonard Street, which was formally opened on 19 February 1893 as Finsbury Technical College.  The institute's director at the time was Sir Philip Magnus, later University MP. Finsbury College was intended as the first of a number of feeder colleges for the Central Institution, but was almost the only one founded.  Finsbury College continued its separate existence until 1926.

The City & Guilds of London Art School was established in 1854, as one of the first Government Schools of Design, in Kennington, south London. It was originally named Lambeth School of Art and was set up to provide training in carving, modelling and architectural decoration. In 1879 the art school began a close working relationship with the City and Guilds Institute. This lasted until 1971, when the art school became an independent charity. The art school focuses on undergraduate and postgraduate study of fine art, stone and wood carving and the conservation of three-dimensional cultural artefacts. The City and Guilds Institute accredits the carving courses and maintains a link with the Art School.

Since 2015, the City & Guilds Group has moved back into delivering training as well as offering qualifications. This was originally through its acquisition of the Oxford Group, but has since included the acquisition of Adelaide-based e3Learning, an Australian corporate elearning and compliance provider, and the Cumbrian-based specialist nuclear industry training provider Gen2.

City and Guilds College
 

Faced with their continuing inability to find a substantial site, the companies were eventually persuaded by the secretary of the Science and Art Department, General Sir John Donnelly (who was also a Royal Engineer) to found their institution on the 87-acre (350,000 m2) site at South Kensington bought by the 1851 Exhibition Commissioners (for £342,500) for 'purposes of art and science' in perpetuity.

The Central Technical College building was designed by Alfred Waterhouse, better known as the architect of the Natural History Museum. Located adjacent to the Central Institute on the site were the Royal School of Mines and the Royal College of Science.

In 1907, the latter two colleges were incorporated by royal charter into the Imperial College of Science and Technology and the CGLI Central Technical College was renamed the City and Guilds College in 1907, but not incorporated into Imperial College until 1910.

Although the City and Guilds College was for much of its life governed through Imperial College, the City and Guilds Institute, together with a number of livery companies in their own right, maintained seats on the governing body (the Court) of Imperial College until its reorganisation in 2002. In 2002, under Imperial College's new faculty structure, City and Guilds College, along with the other constituent colleges, ceased to exist as a separate entity.  In September 2013 the Mechanical and Aeronautical engineering building at Imperial College was renamed City and Guilds Building to acknowledge the historical legacy.  Its name also survives however in the City & Guilds College Union (CGCU)—the student union for the Imperial College Faculty of Engineering and the Imperial College Business School—and in the City & Guilds College Association (CGCA).

Alumni of the CGLI Central Technical College, the City and Guilds College and the new Imperial College Faculty of Engineering, unite under the City & Guilds College Association. Established in 1897 as the Old Centralians, the Association adopted its current name in 1992.

CGLI examination and accreditation bodies
In 1953 the Associated Examinations Board (AEB) was established and administered by City & Guilds.

1964 saw the creation of the National Examining Board for Supervisory Management (NEBSM) as part of the City & Guilds group, specialising in qualifications for supervisors and junior managers.

In 1973, the Technician Education Council (TEC) was created to unify technical education, eventually taking over the validation of courses in further and higher education. These courses led to Ordinary National Certificates and Diplomas (ONC/Ds) and Higher National Certificates and Diplomas (HNC/Ds), which were previously the responsibility of professional bodies. It also saw the introduction of the City & Guilds Mnemonic Code for computer teaching.

In 1974, the Business Education Council (BEC) was established, again administered by City & Guilds. This had a remit to rationalise and improve the relevance of sub-degree vocational education in Further Education and Higher Education colleges and in Polytechnics. Within 18 months, BEC took over responsibility for non-technical ONCs, ONDs, HNCs, HNDs and other qualifications.

BEC merged with TEC in 1984 to form the separately administered Business & Technology Education Council (BTEC). This then merged with the University of London Examinations & Assessment Council (ULEAC) in 1996 to form Edexcel.

In 1990 City & Guilds purchased the Pitman Examinations Institute, and Pitman Qualifications Single Subject awards in business and administration and English language proved to be successful worldwide.

In 2002, the Institute of Leadership & Management (ILM) was formed through the merger of NEBSM and the Institute of Supervisory Management (ISM) and became part of the City & Guilds Group.

In 2004, the National Proficiency Tests Council (NPTC) – specialists for agricultural land based qualifications – became part of the City & Guilds Group.

In 2005, the Hospitality Awarding Body (HAB) – specialists in awards for hospitality and catering – became part of the City & Guilds Group. In January 2010, all active candidates were transferred to City & Guilds courses to remove duplicate award provision across the Group.

In 2008, the City & Guilds Centre for Skills Development was formed as part of the City & Guilds Group. Its mission is to influence and improve skills policy and practice worldwide through an evidence-based approach.

Charitable purpose 

The charitable aims of the City and Guilds of London Institute are:

"Providing internationally recognised qualifications, awards, assessments and support for individuals and organisations in the United Kingdom and overseas across a wide range of occupations in industry, commerce, the public services and elsewhere."

The charitable objects of the institute, as defined in its royal charter, are:

"For the purposes of all such branches of science and the fine arts and for the advancement, dissemination, propagation, promotion, culture and application of all such branches of science and the fine arts as benefit or are of use to or may benefit or be of use to productive and technical industries especially and to commerce and industry generally or any branch thereof."

Qualifications
City & Guilds is an awarding body offering many accredited qualifications mapped onto the Regulated Qualifications Framework (RQF), Credit and Qualifications Framework for Wales (CQFW) and Scottish Credit and Qualifications Framework (SCQF). As of November 2016, City & Guilds offers 2312 different regulated qualifications, more than any other awarding body. These cover entry level to level 7 on the RQF, with most qualifications falling in the entry level to level 3 range.

 Entry-level qualifications are the basics, for beginners.
 Level 1 qualifications are introductory awards, covering basic tasks and knowledge.
 Level 2 is slightly more advanced, needing some knowledge of the subject area.
 Level 3 qualifications cover more complex tasks and also start the development of supervisory skills. In many professions, level 3 is the benchmark to be considered competent.

The range of vocational qualifications covers areas such as engineering technician, arts and craft, tradesman, health and social care, hairdressing, automotive maintenance, construction, and catering, but also more obscure subjects such as sheep shearing, DJing, flower arranging and even door supervision (bouncer).

National Vocational Qualifications
The qualifications available include National Vocational Qualifications (NVQs), most of which are offered at level 2 or 3, although City & Guilds offers NVQs up to Level 7. With 229 NVQs on the Register of Regulated Qualifications (as of November 2016), City & Guilds offers more different NVQs than any other organisation.

TechBac
City & Guilds launched the TechBac in 2014. This is a baccalaureate-style qualification aimed at 16–19-year-old and taking in qualifications in technical skills and workplace skills. It is available at level 2 and level 3, with the level 3 awards attracting UCAS points that can count towards admission to university or college courses. The TechBac can be studied in eleven subjects:
Engineering
Construction
Health & care
Childcare
Automotive
Land
Hospitality & catering
Business
Hair & beauty
Travel & tourism
Building services.

Higher level qualifications
City & Guilds offers higher level qualifications in a wide range of subjects ranging from Professional Engineering, Engineering Technology, Management, Building Services Engineering to various levels of apprenticeships, for higher technicians, tradesman, Craft, Travel and Tourism.

These qualifications consist of outcomes competencies based units, covering core, specialised, and key technical and management areas, which are assessed by means of examinations and written assignment.

Higher Professional Diploma
Higher Professional Diplomas (HPD) were a suite of awards at level 4 of the RQF for people who want to gain advanced technical skills and broader management knowledge. As of February 2017 most have been discontinued and while the Higher Professional Diploma in Sport and Recreation Management is still running, it is no longer open to new learners.

Master Professional Diploma
The Master Professional Diploma (MPD) was a level 7 award suitable for those working at the higher levels in a relevant industry. It is no longer awarded.

Professional Recognition Awards
The City and Guilds Awards for Professional Recognition are accredited awards offered at levels 4 (academic first-year undergraduate or certificate of higher education level) to 7 (academic Master's degree or postgraduate certificate or diploma level) of the Regulated Qualifications Framework, corresponding to the Licentiateship (LCGI), Affiliateship (AfCGI), Graduateship (GCGI) and Membership (MCGI) of the institute.

According to City and Guilds, the characteristics of someone gaining a Professional Recognition Award are:

Licentiateship (LCGI): 
"A level 4 Professional Recognition Award (Licentiateship) candidate would typically:
have first line responsibility for managing day to day activities 
manage resources in own area of responsibility 
constructively work with others to develop and maintain good working relationships 
develop and maintain good customer relationships 
identify and access opportunities for professional development 
be able to apply professional standards in own area of responsibility 
communicate effectively and manage information in line with organisational and legal requirements 
consistently meet aims and objectives 
exercise autonomy and judgement in work role 
consider the views and perspectives of others in decision making 
address problems that are well-defined but non-routine"

Affiliateship (AfCGI): 
"A level 5 Professional Recognition Award (Affiliateship) candidate would typically:
have line management responsibilities 
anticipate, plan and lead change 
manage resources 
constructively work with others to develop and maintain good working relationships 
set direction and inspire others to work together to achieve challenging outcomes 
generate creative ideas to inform best practice and continual improvement 
monitor compliance with professional standards* 
implement an effective communication strategy 
develop and maintain good customer relationships to support the customer focussed culture of the organisation 
analyse, identify and access professional development
address problems that are well-defined but complex and non-routine 
exercising autonomy and judgement in decision making which takes into account the views and perspectives of others"

Graduateship (GCGI): 
"A level 6 Professional Recognition Award (Graduateship) candidate would typically:
have senior management responsibilities 
take responsibility for achieving organisational objectives 
take responsibility for managing a programme of substantial change or development 
identify and manage resources to meet organisational objectives 
take responsibility for motivating, delegating and empowering others 
promote innovation and generate ideas for improvement 
take responsibility for promoting, monitoring and maintaining compliance to professional standards* 
establish, lead and maintaining effective communication 
develop and implement standards for customer service 
evaluate the impact of professional development on self and the organisation 
address problems that are complex and non-routine 
use autonomy to make judgements, demonstrating an ability to understand different perspectives, approaches and schools of thought"

Membership (MCGI): 
"A level 7 Professional Recognition Award (Membership) candidate would typically:
have strategic leadership responsibilities 
articulate a vision for the future of the organisation or own area of responsibility 
take responsibility for leading the organisation or own area of responsibility through complex change 
have an in depth understanding of resources and manage them to meet organisational objectives 
establish a culture of mutual support and cohesion which values the contribution of others and recognises success 
promote innovation and generate ideas for improvement 
establishing an environment and culture that assures and promotes compliance with professional standards* 
develop a communication strategy for the organisation or own area of responsibility 
represent the organisation to communicate on matters of importance and sensitivity and establish robust methods for managing information. 
establish a strategy for putting the customer at the centre of the organisation or own area of responsibility 
champion professional development within the organisation"

Professional Engineering Qualifications

City & Guilds offers graduate (level 6) and postgraduate (level 7) diplomas in engineering. These have been designed in conjunction with professional engineering bodies to ensure that holders can apply for professional registration as an Incorporated Engineer (IEng) with the Graduate Diploma or Chartered Engineer (CEng) with the Postgraduate Diploma. Candidates for professional registration are considered individually through the normal assessment procedures of the relevant professional body for their specific discipline.

The graduate and post graduate diplomas are offered in five areas: civil engineering, mechanical engineering, electrical engineering,  electronic and telecommunication engineering, and information technology. These qualifications can lead to professional registration (IEng or CEng as appropriate) through the following three discipline-specific professional engineering institutions:
Civil Engineering – Institution of Civil Engineers
Mechanical Engineering – Institution of Mechanical Engineers
Electrical Engineering; Electronic and Telecommunication Engineering; Information Technology – Institution of Engineering and Technology

Associateship (ACGI) 

The Associateship of the City and Guilds of London Institute is awarded to undergraduates of the Faculty of Engineering at Imperial College London upon completion of their studies. It is a legacy of the historic City and Guilds College and association between the City and Guilds of London and the college. It is considered a level 6 NVQ qualification, despite involving only academic components, and associates are eligible to use the post-nominal letters ACGI.

Fellowship (FCGI)
Fellowship (FCGI) is the highest honour conferred by the Council of the City and Guilds of London Institute to recognise outstanding professional and personal achievement.  Fellows are leaders of industry, education & academia or government & public sector who have achieved remarkable success in their respective fields. Generally, they hold senior roles such as CEOs, board members or specialist employees or consultants at the national or international level. The FCGI is equivalent to level 8 on the Regulated Qualifications Framework (RQF), the same level as a PhD or Professional Doctorate.

Recognition
 Professional recognition awards authorised by royal charter.
 Professional recognition awards are accredited by Ofqual and included on the Register of Regulated Qualifications.
Vocational qualifications accredited by Ofqual and included on the Register of Regulated Qualifications.

Arms

References

 City and Guilds Qualifications Academic Comparison

External links
 City & Guilds Group website
 City & Guilds website
 City & Guilds NPTC

Educational institutions established in 1878
Education in London
1878 establishments in the United Kingdom
Alfred Waterhouse buildings
Organisations associated with Imperial College London
Vocational education in the United Kingdom